Burning for Buddy: A Tribute to the Music of Buddy Rich, Vol. 2 is a 1997 Buddy Rich tribute album produced by Rush drummer/lyricist Neil Peart.  It is a follow up to 1994's Burning for Buddy: A Tribute to the Music of Buddy Rich and both recording sessions were also released in a 5-hour documentary DVD video in 2006, The Making of Burning for Buddy....

Track listing
"Moment's Notice" – 3:31
Drums performed by Steve Smith
"Basically Blues" – 6:08
Drums performed by Steve Gadd
"Willowcrest" – 4:51
Drums performed by Bill Bruford
"In a Mellow Tone" – 6:17
Drums performed by Gregg Bissonette
"Time Check" – 3:47
Drums performed by Dave Weckl
"Goodbye Yesterday" – 6:15
Drums performed by Simon Phillips
"Groovin' Hard" – 5:29
Drums performed by David Garibaldi
"Big Swing Face" – 4:27
Drums performed by Kenny Aronoff
"Standing up in a Hammock" – 2:54
Drums performed by Marvin "Smitty" Smith
"Take the "A" Train" – 6:11
Drums performed by Joe Morello
"One O'Clock Jump" – 7:46
Drums performed by Neil Peart
"Them There Eyes" – 2:33
Drums performed by Steve Arnold
"Channel One Suite" – 11:34
Drums performed by Buddy Rich

Neil Peart albums
Buddy Rich tribute albums
1997 albums
Atlantic Records albums